Dorsa Derakhshani (born 1998) is an Iranian-American chess player. She was awarded the titles Woman Grandmaster and International Master in 2016.

Chess career
Dorsa Derakhshani won three gold medals at the Asian Youth Chess Championships, in 2012 (in the Girls U14 division), 2013 and 2014 (in the Girls U16). She played for the Iranian National team in the women's division of the Asian Nations Cup in 2012 and 2014.

Derakhshani also qualified for the title of FIDE Trainer in 2016 and is an accredited FIDE journalist.

Derakhshani was a speaker at TedxTalk in Munich, Germany in July 2019. She advised the audience to "Take their freedom of choice seriously" at the TEDxYouth@München.

Conflict with Iranian Chess Federation
In February 2017, the Iranian Chess Federation banned Derakhshani from playing for the Iran national team or playing in any tournaments in Iran on the grounds of "national interests", after she played in the 2017 Gibraltar Chess Festival (when she was already a temporary resident of Spain) without wearing a hijab. Her 15-year-old brother Borna, who is a FIDE Master, was also banned for playing Israeli grandmaster Alexander Huzman in the first round of the same tournament. Derakhshani had previously played in several tournaments without a hijab. Derakhshani gave only one interview in response to the media attention, to Chess.com. She also wrote a piece for The New York Times at the end of 2017.

Career in the United States
Following the ban, Derakhshani accepted a place at Saint Louis University to study Biology on a pre-med track, winning a scholarship to play on the Saint Louis University Chess Team and taking up the role of SLU Woman Team Captain (2019-2022). Because of this, Derakhshani began to play for the United States of America in 2017. Saint Louis chess team won silver in 2017 Pan American intercollegiate chess championship. She played in the 2018 US Women's Chess Championship. In 2019, she accompanied her team to achieve bronze in the World Prestigious University Chess Invitational in Tianjin, China and she individually, achieved the first runner-up on board three in the tournament. She finished third in the 2020 US Women's Championship.

Derakhshani's peak rating was in 2405 in July 2016

Education 
Derakhshani graduated Magna Cum Laude from St. Louis University in 2022. She is currently an admitted medical student at University of Missouri School of Medicine (Mizzou)

References

External links 

Dorsa Derakhshani chess games at 365Chess.com

Dorsa Derakhshani team chess record at Olimpbase.org
Brief interview by Powerplay Chess (youtube)
Beyond Chess - interview by Markus Lammers
Why I Left Iran to Play Chess in America - Op-Ed in the New York Times by Dorsa Derakhshani

1998 births
Living people
Chess International Masters
Chess woman grandmasters
Iranian female chess players
Sportspeople from Tehran
Iranian emigrants to the United States
Saint Louis University alumni